The 1936 United States Senate election in Minnesota took place on November 3, 1936. Incumbent Farmer–Laborite Elmer A. Benson, who had been temporarily appointed by Governor Floyd B. Olson in 1935 to fill the seat of the deceased Republican U.S. Senator Thomas D. Schall, opted to run for Governor rather than seek election to a full term or to fill the remainder of the unexpired term. Governor Olson won the Farmer–Labor primary for nomination to the full Senate term, but died of stomach cancer prior to the general election. In Olson's place, the Farmer–Labor Party ran U.S. Representative Ernest Lundeen, who went on to defeat former Governor Theodore Christianson of the Republican Party of Minnesota in the general election. A special election held on the same date elected Republican nominee Guy V. Howard to serve the remainder of Schall's unexpired term.

Democratic primary

Candidates

Declared
 Patrick J. Delaney
 Beldin H. Loftsgaarden, Conservative State Senator from the 37th district since 1931

Results

Following the death of Floyd B. Olson, the Minnesota Democratic Party opted not to field its nominees in the 1936 senatorial and gubernatorial elections. Consequently, regardless of the fact that the Minnesota Democratic Party had held a primary election and Delaney had won the Democratic nomination in that primary election, Delaney did not appear on the general election ballot.

Farmer–Labor primary

Candidates

Declared
 Floyd B. Olson, 22nd Governor of Minnesota since 1931
 Carl E. Taylor

Results

Olson's death
Two months after winning the primary, Olson died of stomach cancer at the Mayo Clinic in Rochester, Minnesota. The state central committee of the Farmer–Labor Party selected Ernest Lundeen, who had served in the United States House of Representatives as a Farmer–Laborite since 1933, had previously served as a Republican in the U.S. House of Representatives from 1917 to 1919, and had been a member of the nonpartisan Minnesota House of Representatives from 1911 to 1914, to fill the vacancy in the party's nomination.

Republican primary

Candidates

Declared
 Theodore Christianson, U.S. Representative since 1933 and 21st Governor of Minnesota (1925-1931)
 Margaret H. Schall (named on the ballot as "Mrs. Thomas D. Schall"), widow of Thomas D. Schall

Results

General election

Results

See also 
 United States Senate elections, 1936 and 1937

References

1936
Minnesota
United States Senate